Days of Future Passed is the second album and first concept album by English prog rock band The Moody Blues, released in November 1967 by Deram Records. With its fusion of orchestral and rock elements, it has been cited as one of the first examples of progressive rock.

The album was recorded at a time when the Moody Blues were suffering financial difficulties and lack of critical and commercial success. Their parent label, Decca Records, planned to release a classical LP to showcase the stereo recording techniques of its new imprint, Deram, but instead brought in the group to create an original work combining pop with progressive orchestrations arranged and conducted by Peter Knight. They composed a suite of songs about the life of everyday man, with the group and orchestra mostly playing separately and mixed together. It was a moderate success upon release, but following steady radio airplay, particularly of the hit single "Nights in White Satin", it became a top ten US hit in 1972. It has since been listed among the most important albums of 1967 by Rolling Stone.

Background and recording 
The Moody Blues had started out as a rhythm and blues band, and had achieved commercial success in late 1964/early 1965 with the UK No.1 and US Top 10 single "Go Now", but by late 1966, they had run into financial difficulties and personnel changes. The new singer and guitarist Justin Hayward said "we had no money, nothing". According to the group, in September 1967 Decca, their record company, asked them to record an adaptation of Antonín Dvořák's Symphony No. 9 for Decca's newly formed Deram Records division in order to demonstrate their latest recording techniques, which were named "Deramic Sound". Recording engineer Derek Varnals disputes this story, claiming that even at the start of the sessions in 1967 there was no intent to record a Dvořák album and that talk of this project did not emerge until the mid-1970s.

Decca had experimented with stereophonic sound for classical recordings, and hoped to capture the pop market in the same 
way, by interweaving classical recordings with the group's interpretation of the same music. Instead, the band (initially without the label's knowledge) decided to focus on an album based on an original stage show that they had been working on, and mix that with classical arrangements of those songs. Keyboardist Mike Pinder had purchased a Mellotron, a tape replay keyboard, and written a song, "Dawn Is a Feeling" as a starting point for a concept piece about a day in the life of everyday man. Hayward wrote "Nights in White Satin" about the changes between one relationship and another, using bedsheets as a metaphor. When Pinder added a string line on the Mellotron to accompany Hayward's basic song framework, the group realised they had written something notable and a suitable ending for the song cycle.

Recording sessions for the album took place at Decca Studios in West Hampstead, London, between 9 May and 3 November 1967. The band worked with record producer Tony Clarke, engineer Derek Varnals, and conductor Peter Knight. The group recorded and mixed their sessions first, then passed the finished tapes over to Knight for arranging and recording the orchestral interludes.

Content 
The album's music features psychedelic rock ballads by Hayward, Pinder, Lodge, and Thomas and orchestral interludes by the London Festival Orchestra. The band and the orchestra only actually play together during the last part of "Nights In White Satin".

Music writers cite the album as an early example of progressive rock music. Bill Holdship of Yahoo! Music remarks that the band "created an entire genre here." David Fricke cites it as one of the essential albums of 1967 and finds it "closer to high-art pomp than psychedelia. But there is a sharp pop discretion to the writing and a trippy romanticism in the mirroring effect of the strings and Mike Pinder's Mellotron." Will Hermes cites the album as an essential progressive rock record and opines that its use of the Mellotron, a tape replay keyboard, made it a "signature" element of the genre. An influential work of the counterculture period, AllMusic editor Bruce Eder calls the album "one of the defining documents of the blossoming psychedelic era, and one of the most enduringly popular albums of its era".

Original and later mixes 

In July 1978, it was discovered that the UK master tapes for Days of Future Passed had deteriorated. As a result of this, the album was remixed in its entirety in August 1978, which was used for reissues between 1978 and 2017. Some compilations, however, continued to use the original 1967 stereo mix for certain songs. The album's original mix was eventually released in its entirety on compact disc in November 2017.

The ways in which the later mix departs most noticeably from the original are:
 After the orchestral intro, "Dawn Is a Feeling" begins more abruptly, and there is less echo on Mike Pinder's vocal on the bridge, making it more prominent.
 On "Another Morning" Ray Thomas's double vocals are spread left and right in the stereo channel. The flute interlude is also played twice towards the end of the song before the orchestral segue.
 The orchestral intro "Lunch Break" goes on about 15 seconds longer before fading out.
 The bridges to "(Evening) Time to Get Away" have John Lodge singing alone; all the backing vocals on that part have been lost.
 The end of "(Evening) Time to Get Away" is missing a Mellotron part and only repeats twice, instead of three times.
 "The Sun Set" is missing some piano parts, percussion parts, and the reverb on "through the night" is different.
 "Twilight Time" begins more abruptly after the orchestral interlude.
 The backing vocals on "Twilight Time" are heard through the entire song instead of only coming in at certain points.
 At the beginning of "Nights in White Satin", as the orchestral prelude ends, there is one less beat of time before the rhythm section starts in.
 Some of the strings near the end of "Nights in White Satin" (before "Late Lament") are out of sync with the main body of the song.

Release 

The Moody Blues did not play any of the music to Decca executives until it was complete. Upon the first play, they were disappointed with the result as it was not the Dvorak arrangements they expected. Walt Maguire, representative for London Records (Decca's North American arm), however, thought it would be a strong seller in the US, so it was agreed to release the album as recorded.

Days of Future Passed was released on 10 November 1967 in the UK and arrived in the US in March 1968. It reached number 27 in the UK Albums Chart. In the US, it was a steady seller in the late 1960s, helped by FM radio play of "Nights in White Satin", and eventually peaked at number 2 on the US Billboard chart in 1972.

Days of Future Passed was the second and last album to be released in both stereo and mono formats in the U.S. The mono version (Deram DE-16012) was pressed in a limited quantity as it was released during the "phase-out" of mono LP releases by the major record companies, thus it is an often-sought item amongst record collectors.

Upon its release, Rolling Stone gave the album an unenthusiastic review, writing "The Moody Blues [...] have matured considerably since 'Go Now', but their music is constantly marred by one of the most startlingly saccharine conceptions of 'beauty' and 'mysticism' that any rock group has ever affected." New York magazine dismissed it as "a ponderous mound of thought-jello." The album has since received acclaim; for example, Spin cited it as a classic of progressive rock. By 2007, Rolling Stone, which had originally described Days of Future Passed as "an English rock group strangling itself in conceptual goo" included it in its list of the essential albums of 1967.

Days of Future Passed was issued as a discrete Quadraphonic open-reel tape in 1977. This master was also used for a 2001 dts 5.1 channel audio CD release and again for a two-disc Deluxe Edition SACD release in 2006.

On 17 November 2017 this original mix was made available for the first time on CD as Days of Future Passed 50th Anniversary Deluxe Edition.  Also released The Moody Blues Days of Future Past Live that was recorded live in Toronto on 13 July 2017 with a full orchestra backup.

Track listing
All compositions originally credited to "Redwave-Knight", except "Dawn Is a Feeling", "Forever Afternoon (Tuesday)", "The Sunset" and "Nights in White Satin". ('Redwave' is an alias of Justin Hayward.)

Note: "(Evening) Time to Get Away" is unlisted on original pressings, but has since been added to all proceeding track listings.

Personnel

The Moody Blues
Justin Hayward – acoustic and electric guitars, piano, sitar, vocals
John Lodge – bass, vocals 
Mike Pinder – Mellotron, piano, tamboura, gong, vocals (including spoken)
Ray Thomas – flutes, percussion, piano, vocals
Graeme Edge – drums, percussion, vocals
with:
Peter Knight – conducting, arrangements
The London Festival Orchestra

Production
 Tony Clarke – production
 Derek Varnals – engineering
 Hugh Mendl – executive production, liner notes
 Michael Dacre-Barclay - production
 David Anstey – cover design, cover painting
 Steven Fallone – digital remastering

Charts

Certifications

References

Further reading

External links
 
 ARCHIVE.org scan of album art painting

1967 albums
Albums arranged by Peter Knight (composer)
Albums conducted by Peter Knight (composer)
Albums produced by Tony Clarke (producer)
Deram Records albums
Proto-prog albums
Symphonic rock albums
The Moody Blues albums
Concept albums